The subfamily Detarioideae is one of the subdivisions of the plant family Fabaceae (legumes). This subfamily includes many tropical trees, some of which are used for timber or have ecological importance. The subfamily consists of 84 genera, most of which are native to Africa and Asia. Pride of Burma (Amherstia nobilis) and tamarind (Tamarindus indica) are two of the most notable species in Detarioideae. It has the following clade-based definition:
The most inclusive crown clade containing Goniorrhachis marginata Taub. and Aphanocalyx cynometroides Oliv., but not Cercis canadensis L., Duparquetia orchidacea Baill., or Bobgunnia fistuloides (Harms) J. H. Kirkbr. & Wiersema.

Taxonomy
Detarioideae comprises the following tribes and genera:

Schotieae
 Schotia Jacq.

Barnebydendreae
 Barnebydendron J.H.Kirkbr.
 Goniorrhachis Taub.

Detarieae

 Augouardia Pellegr.
 Baikiaea Benth.
 Brandzeia Baill.
 Colophospermum J. Kirk ex J. Léonard
 Copaifera L.
 Daniellia Benn.
 Detarium Juss.
 Eperua Aubl.

 Eurypetalum Harms
 Gilletiodendron Vermoesen

 Guibourtia Benn.
 Hardwickia Roxb.
 Hylodendron Taub.
 Hymenaea L.

 Neoapaloxylon Rauschert

 Peltogyne Vogel
 Prioria Griseb.

 Sindora Miq.
 Sindoropsis J. Léonard
 Stemonocoleus Harms
 †Salpinganthium Poinar & K.L. Chambers
 Tessmannia Harms

Saraceae
 Endertia Steenis & de Wit
 Leucostegane Prain
 Lysidice Hance
 Saraca L.

Afzelieae
 Afzelia Sm.
 Brodriguesia R.S. Cowan
 Intsia Thouars

Amherstieae

 Amherstia Wall.
 Annea Mackinder & Wieringa
 Anthonotha P. Beauv.
 Aphanocalyx Oliver
 Berlinia Sol. ex Hook. f.
 Bikinia Wieringa
 Brachycylix (Harms) R.S. Cowan
 Brachystegia Benth.
 Brownea Jacq.
 Browneopsis Huber
 Crudia Schreb.
 Cryptosepalum Benth.
 Cynometra L.
 Dicymbe Spruce ex Benth. & Hook. f.
 Didelotia Baill.
 Ecuadendron D.A. Neill
 Elizabetha Schomb. ex Benth.
 Englerodendron Harms
 Gabonius Wieringa & Mackinder
 Gilbertiodendron J. Léonard
 Heterostemon Desf.
 Humboldtia Vahl
 Hymenostegia (Benth.) Harms
 Icuria Wieringa
 Isoberlinia Craib & Stapf ex Holland

 Isomacrolobium Aubrév. & Pellegr.
 Julbernardia Pellegr.
 Lebruniodendron J. Léonard
 Leonardoxa Aubrév.
 Librevillea Hoyle
 Loesenera Harms
 Macrolobium Schreb.
 Maniltoa Scheff.
 Michelsonia Hauman
 Micklethwaitia G.P. Lewis & Schrire
 Microberlinia A. Chev.

 Neochevalierodendron J. Léonard
 Normandiodendron J. Léonard
 Oddoniodendron De Wild.
 Paloue Aubl.
 Paloveopsis R.S. Cowan
 Paramacrolobium J.Léonard

 Plagiosiphon Harms
 Polystemonanthus Harms
 Pseudomacrolobium Hauman

 Scorodophloeus Harms
 Talbotiella Baker f.
 Tamarindus L.
 Tetraberlinia (Harms) Hauman
 Zenkerella Taub.

Phylogenetics
Detarioideae exhibits the following phylogenetic relationships:

References

 

 
Rosid subfamilies
Afrotropical realm flora